Robert Andrew Wakenshaw (born 22 December 1965, in Ponteland) is an English former professional footballer who played as a striker.

Career
Wakenshaw played for Everton, Carlisle United, Doncaster Rovers, Rochdale, Crewe Alexandra, Fleetwood, Northwich Victoria and Southport.

He also participated at the 1985 FIFA World Youth Championship.

Later life
His two sons were attacked by a football hooligan in October 2014.

References

1965 births
Living people
Everton F.C. players
Carlisle United F.C. players
Doncaster Rovers F.C. players
Rochdale A.F.C. players
Crewe Alexandra F.C. players
Fleetwood Town F.C. players
Northwich Victoria F.C. players
Southport F.C. players
English Football League players
Association football forwards
English footballers
People from Ponteland
Footballers from Northumberland